The Potter-Blocker Trail (sometimes called the Potter-Bacon Cutoff), and also just the potter-bacon trail was a trail blazed by Jack Potter used to move cattle to market, starting around 1883. It was a collateral branch of the Great Western Cattle Trail, but was shorter and crossed more unforgiving land. The trail went at least from Hebbronville, Texas up to Albany, TX, intersecting the Western Trail at Alice, Texas.

It was likely never a widely utilized trail, since it sprang up so late—by 1889, trail drives had fallen out of use as rail lines increasingly connected distant states with the rest of the country.

References
Handbook of Texas Online, retrieved May 15, 2010.

Historic trails and roads in Texas
Trails and roads in the American Old West